Kandgal  is a village in the northern state of Karnataka, India. It is located in the Hungund taluk of Bagalkot district in Karnataka.

Demographics
 India census, Kandgal had a population of 5728 with 2874 males and 2854 females.

See also
 Bagalkot
 Districts of Karnataka
ilkal

References

External links
 http://Bagalkot.nic.in/

Villages in Bagalkot district